Żukowo Zachodnie is a non-operational PKP railway station in Żukowo (Pomeranian Voivodeship), Poland.

Lines crossing the station

References 
Żukowo Zachodnie article at Polish stations database, URL accessed at 17 March 2006

Railway stations in Pomeranian Voivodeship
Disused railway stations in Pomeranian Voivodeship
Kartuzy County